Marene is a comune (municipality) in the Province of Cuneo in the Italian region Piedmont, located about  south of Turin and about  northeast of Cuneo.

Marene borders the following municipalities: Cavallermaggiore, Cervere, Cherasco, and Savigliano.

Demographic evolution

References

External links
 www.comune.marene.cn.it/

Cities and towns in Piedmont